Preslav Petrov may refer to:

Preslav Petrov (footballer, born 1995), Bulgarian defender for PFC Dunav Ruse and formerly for PFC Ludogorets Razgrad
Preslav Petrov (footballer, born 1997), Bulgarian defender for PFC Ludogorets Razgrad